Gary Evans may refer to:

 Gary Evans (serial killer) (1954–1998), American serial killer
 Gary Evans (racing driver) (born 1960), British former racing driver
 Gary Evans (golfer) (born 1969), English golfer
 Gary Evans (psychologist) (born 1948), American psychologist

See also

Gareth Evans (disambiguation)